The Marvelous Night or The Night of Marvels (French: La nuit merveilleuse) is a 1940 French comedy film directed by Jean-Paul Paulin and starring Fernandel, Charles Vanel and Janine Darcey.

Cast
 Fernandel as Le berger  
 Charles Vanel as Le fermier  
 Janine Darcey as La jeune femme  
 Fernand Charpin as L'aubergiste  
 Jean Daurand as Le mari  
 Milly Mathis as La paysanne  
 Madeleine Robinson as La réfugiée  
 Édouard Delmont as Le vieux berger  
 Jean Aquistapace as Le voyageur  
 Jacques Erwin as Le forgeron  
 Charlotte Clasis as La servante  
 Jane Marken as Mathilde, l'hôtelière  
 René Fleur as L'explorateur 
 Couty Bonneval 
 Wanny Teers

References

Bibliography 
 Mark Connelly. Christmas at the Movies: Images of Christmas in American, British and European Cinema. I.B.Tauris, 2000.

External links 
 

1940 films
1940 comedy films
French comedy films
1940s French-language films
Films directed by Jean-Paul Paulin
French black-and-white films
1940s French films